ImaginAsian Entertainment, Inc was a multimedia company founded by Michael Hong and Augustine Hong and a group of investors that recognized the emerging importance of "all-things Asian."  Based in New York City, its main attraction was a television network, iaTV, which premiered in 2004 and which focused on entertainment featuring Korean, Japanese, and South-East Asian content. The channel competed in certain markets with AZN Television until April 2008, when the competing network ceased broadcasting. ImaginAsian itself ceased operations in 2011, selling its channel slot to CJ E&M for broadcast of the world feed of Mnet.

They also operated The ImaginAsian, a renovated movie theater located in Midtown Manhattan that shows only first-run and classic East Asian films, as well as several film festivals per year. The company renovated a second former movie theater in Los Angeles that opened in December 2007, the former Linda Lea Theater, which originally showed Japanese films and served the Little Tokyo area before shuttering in the 1980s.

In addition, past divisions of the company consisted of iaLink, ImaginAsian Entertainment's monthly on-line magazine, which at one point had over ten million subscribers, ImaginAsian Pictures and Home Entertainment, a film and DVD distribution division that released several DVDs of East Asian films and iaTV original shows, and the successful theatrical and DVD release of the Vietnamese American film Journey from the Fall, and iaRadio, a block of radio programming both streamed on-line as well as made available on certain terrestrial stations.

List of corporate affiliates
ImaginAsian Entertainment (IAEI) is the corporate parent
ImaginAsianTV (iaTV) is the television network
ImaginAsian Radio (iaRadio) is a streaming online radio
iaLink is an online e-zine
The ImaginAsian Theater, a movie theater in New York City which is now owned by Phoenix Theatres
ImaginAsian Pictures is for the creation, distribution, and promotion of films
ImaginAsian Home Entertainment is the DVD and home video division
The ImaginAsian Center is the film/event theatre in the Gallery Row area of Los Angeles, California, which opened on December 1, 2007.  The Los Angeles center seems to have stopped operations in October 2008, though its web site (https://web.archive.org/web/20090105222531/http://www.theimaginasian.com/la) is still up.

Shows aired on ImaginAsian

Television programs

Eastern Animation

Japanese

Korean

List of over-the-air TV channels and cable providers

Cable/satellite providers
 New York, New York - Time Warner Cable Channel 560
 Hudson Valley, New York - Time Warner Cable Channel 560
 Los Angeles, California - Time Warner Cable Channel 157
Charter Communications Channel 143 
Champion Broadband Channel 196 (Arcadia, Monrovia and Pasadena) 
 San Francisco, California - Comcast Channel 28
 Princeton, New Jersey - Patriot Media Channel 149 
 Houston, Texas - Comcast Channel 241
TVMax Channel 109 
Fision Channel 349
 Dallas, Texas - Time Warner Cable Channel 342
 Fairfax County, Virginia - Cox Communications Channel 465
 Hawaii - Oceanic Time Warner Cable Channel 134

Broadcast television stations
 Edison, New Jersey - WDVB-CA (Formerly W36AS) Channel 39 (Middlesex, Monmouth, Essex and Union Counties)

See also
 List of United States over-the-air television networks

Television networks in the United States
Defunct television networks in the United States
Asian-American television
Mass media companies established in 2004
Companies disestablished in 2011
Television channels and stations established in 2004
Television channels and stations disestablished in 2011
Companies based in New York City